Eugene Edward "Gene" Campbell (April 26, 1915 – April 10, 1986) was an American professor of history at Brigham Young University.

Biography
Campbell was born and raised in Tooele, Utah, in a working-class Latter-day Saint family, Edward Campbell and Betsy Ann Bowen.  When Campbell was fourteen, his father, who was a railroad engineer, died suddenly.  His mother was active in the community and her elected position as county treasurer helped the family survive the Great Depression.

Education and military service
Following his 1933 graduation from Tooele High School, his interest in sports led him to attend Snow Junior College in Ephraim, Utah.  He was not very active in sports and student government and received his Associate of Arts degree in 1935.  Then he served as a missionary for the Church of Jesus Christ of Latter-day Saints (LDS Church) in Eastern Canada.  After returning home in 1937 and studying history at the University of Utah, Campbell received his bachelor's degree in history with honors in 1939 and his master's degree in 1940.

In 1939, Campbell married Beth Larsen, whom he knew in high school and had dated for seven years.  They would have five children.

After teaching LDS Seminary part-time for a year, Campbell became a full-time instructor from 1940 to 1944 in Wayne County, Utah, and Magna, Utah.

From 1944 to 1946, during World War II, Campbell served in the Chaplain Corps of the United States Army as a First Lieutenant.  He attended Chaplains School at Harvard University and was assigned to the 71st Infantry Division and received two battle stars.

After the war, Campbell returned to religious teaching in the LDS Church Educational System, this time in the church's Institutes of Religion, first as Institute director at Idaho State University in Pocatello, then as associate director at Utah State University at Logan.  Campbell completed his Ph.D. at the University of Southern California in 1952, writing his dissertation on the history of the LDS Church in California.

Academic career
After completing his education, Campbell taught at Ricks College in Rexburg, Idaho, until joining the history faculty of BYU from 1956 to 1980.  At BYU, Campbell worked in various capacities and held many positions, including the history department's acting chair (1958–59) and chair (1960–67), chair of Visiting Professor Lectureships (1965), tour leader for BYU Tours of Europe, associate director for a study abroad program (1965), board member of the Charles Redd Center for Western Studies (1972–80), member of the Athletic Advisory Council, member of the Graduate Council, member of the Faculty Advisor Council, president of the BYU chapter of AAUP (1965–66), member of the board of editors for BYU Studies (1968–73), and main speaker at the 1973 and 1980 graduations of the College of Social Sciences.  He also taught history at the Church College of Hawaii, while on leave from BYU in 1967–68.

Campbell was also involved in the larger historical community.  In 1965 he was one of the co-founders of the Mormon History Association, served as its first vice president, and the next year was its second president.  He was active in the Utah State Historical Society, serving as president of its Utah Valley Chapter in 1968 and a Fellow in 1978, an honor only given to fifteen others before, including to Fawn Brodie, Leonard J. Arrington, LeRoy Hafen and Juanita Brooks.  Campbell was a member of the Danforth Associates and the Western History Association, and consulted for the National Endowment for the Humanities for many years starting in 1975.

List of publications
The following is a list of Campbell's published work:

Books

Articles

Papers

Book reviews
Eugene Campbell reviewed numerous books for various academic journals.

Notes

References
 Publisher's foreword to Establishing Zion

Further reading

Reviews of Campbell's work
Fort Bridger: Island in the Wilderness
 Davis, W. N., Jr. (January 1976). Western Historical Quarterly 7: 80.
 Murray, Robert A. (Winter 1976). Utah Historical Quarterly 44 (1): 98–99. 
 Raines, Edgar Frank, Jr. (Summer 1976). Arizona and the West 18: 185–87.
 Mattes, Merrill J. (Fall 1976). Colorado Magazine 53: 380–81.

Fort Supply: Brigham Young's Green River Experiment
 Edwards, Elbert B. (Spring 1978). Utah Historical Quarterly 46 (2): 205–06.

Utah's History
 Petersen, Scott R. (August 1978). Mountainwest 4: 58.
 (June–July 1979). Frontier Times 53: 39.
 Layton, Stanford J. (September–October 1979). American West 16: 54–55.
 Smith, Melvin T. (January 1980). Western Historical Quarterly: 74–75.
 Sillito, John R. (Spring 1982). Idaho Yesterdays 26: 37–38.

Utah: A Guide to the State
 Arrington, Leonard J. (Fall 1982). BYU Studies 22: 502–04.

Establishing Zion
 (October 1, 1988). Church News (58): 13.
 Etter, Patricia A. (December 1988). Books of the Southwest (361): 9.
 Walker, Ronald W. (Spring 1989). BYU Studies 29 (2): 126–27. 
 Smith, Melvin T. (Spring 1989). Utah Historical Quarterly 57 (2): 181–83. 
 Pointer, Richard W. (April 1989). Pacific Northwest Quarterly 80 (2): 73. 
 Parrish, William Earl (July 1989). Journal of the West 28 (3): 92. 
 Sadler, Richard W. (Fall 1989). Dialogue: A Journal of Mormon Thought 22 (3): 152–154. 
 Lyman, E. Leo (November 1989). Western Historical Quarterly 20 (4): 454–55.
 DePillis, Mario S. (December 1989). Journal of American History 76 (3): 933–34.
 May, Dean L. (June 1990). Sunstone 14 (3): 55–56.
 Peterson, Charles S. (July 1990). New Mexico Historical Review 65 (3): 384–85.

The Essential Brigham Young
 Guarneri, Carl. (Spring 1993). Journal of the Early Republic 13 (1): 110–12.
 Jones, Gerald E. (December 1993). Church History 62 (4): 573–74.

External links 
 
 
 

1915 births
1986 deaths
20th-century Mormon missionaries
American Latter Day Saint writers
United States Army chaplains
United States Army personnel of World War II
American Mormon missionaries in Canada
Brigham Young University faculty
Brigham Young University–Hawaii faculty
Brigham Young University–Idaho faculty
Church Educational System instructors
Historians of the Latter Day Saint movement
Historians of Utah
Idaho State University faculty
People from Tooele, Utah
Snow College alumni
University of Southern California alumni
University of Utah alumni
Writers from Utah
20th-century American historians
20th-century American male writers
Latter Day Saints from California
Latter Day Saints from Idaho
Latter Day Saints from Utah
American male non-fiction writers